"Game over" is a message often displayed at the end of a video game.

Game Over may also refer to:

Books 
Game Over (Sheff book), a 1993 book about the history of Nintendo by David Sheff
Game Over: Jerry Sandusky, Penn State, and the Culture of Silence a 2012 book by Bill Moushey and Bob Dvorchak
Game Over: How You Can Prosper in a Shattered Economy, a 2009 nonfiction book by Stephen Leeb
Daniel X: Game Over, the fourth book in James Patterson's Daniel X novel series

Film 
Deadly Games (1989 film), a French horror film also known as Game Over
Game Over (2003 film), an American television film
Game Over (2005 film), a film featuring Jarkko Niemi
Game Over (2013 film), an Iranian animated short film
Game Over (2019 film), an Indian Tamil/Telugu bilingual film
 Game Over: Kasparov and the Machine, a 2003 chess documentary
Spy Kids 3-D: Game Over, the 2003 third film of the Spy Kids trilogy

Music

Albums
Game Over (Nuclear Assault album), 1986
Game Over (P-Square album) or the title song, 2007
Game Over (EP) or the title song, by Dave, 2017
Game Over, by Blanco and The Jacka, 2013
Game Over, by Ska-P, 2018
Game Over, by Tempo, 1999

Songs
"Game Over" (Josie Zec song), representing Croatia at Junior Eurovision 2014
"Game Over" (Martin Garrix and Loopers song), 2018
"Game Over" (Tinchy Stryder song), 2010
"Game Over" (Vitaa song), 2013
"Game Over (Flip)", by Lil' Flip, 2003
"Game Over", by Alexa Vega, 2003
"Game Over", by Destiny's Child from Destiny Fulfilled, 2004
"Game Over", by Falling in Reverse from Fashionably Late, 2013
"Game Over", by G.E.M., 2009
"Game Over", by Machine Head from Bloodstone & Diamonds, 2014
"Game Over", by Nightingale from I, 2000
"Game Over", by Scarface from The Untouchable, 1997
"Game Over", by VV Brown from Travelling Like the Light, 2009
"Computer-Reign (Game Over)", by Ayreon from The Final Experiment, 1995

Television 
Game Over (TV series), a 2004 American computer-animated sitcom
Game Over, a British video-game magazine show on .tv
Game Over, a character in the video-game segment of the game show Nick Arcade

Episodes 
"Game Over" (30 Rock)
"Game Over" (Ben 10)
"Game Over" (CSI: Miami)
"Game Over" (Dexter's Laboratory)
"Game Over" (Heroes Reborn)
"Game Over" (Ultimate Spider-Man)
"Game Over" (YuYu Hakusho)

Other 
 Game Over or #GameOver, campaign focused on the treatment of asylum seekers in Australia headed by Craig Foster
Game Over (video game), a 1987 computer game
 Iris Kyle (born 1974), nicknamed Game Over, American professional bodybuilder
 Mike Green (ice hockey, born 1985), former NHL player nicknamed "Game Over" while playing for the Washington Capitals